Nordic is a census-designated place (CDP) in Lincoln County, Wyoming, United States. The population was 602 at the 2010 census.

Geography

References

Census-designated places in Lincoln County, Wyoming
Census-designated places in Wyoming